Philip Albert Child (January 19, 1898 – February 6, 1978) was a Canadian novelist, poet, and academic.

Born in Hamilton, Ontario, the son of William Addison Child and Elizabeth Helen (Harvey) Child graduated from Ridley College, St. Catharines  in 1915 and then studied at Trinity College where he received a Bachelor of Arts degree after serving during World War I. He received a Bachelor of Arts degree from Christ's College, Cambridge in 1921 and received a Master of Arts and Ph.D. from Harvard University. He was a journalist and taught for a time at the University of British Columbia while writing several novels. In 1942, he became a professor at Trinity College eventually becoming Chancellor's Professor of English.

He won the Ryerson Fiction Award twice, in 1945 for Day of Wrath and in 1949 for Mr. Ames Against Time. He also won the 1949 Governor General's Award for Mr. Ames Against Time.

Selected works
 The Village of Souls (1933)
 God's Sparrows (1937)
 Day of Wrath (1945)
 Mr. Ames Against Time (1948)
 The Victorian House: And Other Poems (1951)
 Come Rack (1954)
 The Wood of the Nightingale (1965)

References

External links
Archives of Philip Child (Philip Child fonds, R11722) are held at Library and Archives Canada

1898 births
1978 deaths
Alumni of Christ's College, Cambridge
Canadian male novelists
20th-century Canadian poets
20th-century Canadian male writers
Canadian male poets
Governor General's Award-winning fiction writers
University of Toronto alumni
Harvard University alumni
Writers from Hamilton, Ontario
Trinity College (Canada) alumni
Academic staff of the University of British Columbia
20th-century Canadian novelists